The Erskine Bridge Tolls Act 2001 is an Act of the Scottish Parliament which restored, with retrospective effect (other than as regards criminal liability), the power to levy tolls. This power was originally conferred by section 1(1) of the UK Parliament Erskine Bridge Tolls Act 1968.

The problem
Toll charges on the Erskine Bridge were suspended in August 2001, after the Scottish Executive discovered it had been collecting money illegally for several weeks following a failure to extend the legislation which allowed designated officials to collect money for the crossing over the River Clyde near Glasgow.

Passage through Parliament
A few weeks later, the Erskine Bridge Tolls Act 2001 asp 12 was passed by the Scottish Parliament by 78 votes to 26, with no abstentions. The Scottish National Party fought the Bill during its day-long passage through the Scottish Parliament, arguing that it was being rushed through without proper consultation. Adam Ingram, the SNP transport spokesman, insisted that the use of emergency procedures meant the public and the local authorities, such as West Dunbartonshire and Renfrewshire councils, were being denied the right to object. The bill was given royal assent on 13 September 2001.

Subsequent legislation 
Following Phase II of the Scottish Executive's Tolled Bridges Review, the Act was effectively set aside by the formal ministerial suspension of tolls in 2006. The remaining provisions of the 1968 Act were superseded by the Abolition of Bridge Tolls (Scotland) Act 2008 (asp 1).

See also
List of Acts of the Scottish Parliament from 1999

References

External links 

Tolled Bridges Review: Phase Two Report, The Scottish Government, 8 March 2006

Acts of the Scottish Parliament 2001
Former toll bridges in Scotland
Toll (fee)